Hagit Yona Beril (born December 10, 1974) is an Israeli Paralympic table tennis player, and weightlifter.

She competed at the 2000 Summer Paralympics and 2016 Summer Paralympics. She won a bronze medal at the European Championships.

Life 
She grew up in Ramat Gan and as a child practiced swimming in Maccabiah Village.  During her military service in the Intelligence Corps, Beryl was injured.

The beginning of her career in para sports was in weightlifting. She trained with Avi Brunner.  She competed at the 2000 Summer Paralympics, in Sydney, where Beryl set a national record in weightlifting, when she pressed 62.5 kg and was ranked ninth.

In 2010, she served as a parliamentary assistant to Knesset member Yisrael Hason, becoming the first parliamentary assistant, reliant on a wheelchair.

In 2015, she began competing in table tennis at the international level and won a silver medal at the German Open Championship. She won a bronze medal in the Czech Open Championship . She competed at the 2016 Paralympic Games in Rio de Janeiro, in the individual tournament, and the team tournament with Carolyn Taviv. She lost both games in the group stage of the singles tournament, and did not advance to the quarterfinals.

In September 2019, she competed at the European Para Table Tennis Championships, winning a bronze medal.

References 

1974 births
Powerlifters at the 2000 Summer Paralympics
Living people
Table tennis players at the 2016 Summer Paralympics
Paralympic table tennis players of Israel